Uhlen is a surname. Notable people with the surname include: 

Gisela Uhlen (1919–2007), German actress and screenwriter
Mathias Uhlén (born 1954), Swedish biologist and biotechnologist
Susanne Uhlen (born 1955), German actress, daughter of Gisela

German-language surnames